The third season of the Sgt. Frog anime series consists of the fifty-one episodes after episode one-hundred-and-three from the series, which first aired in Japan from April 7, 2006 to March 30, 2007 on TV Tokyo. Season 3 uses 5 songs: 2 Openings and 3 Endings.  by Jicho Kacho is used as Opening from episode 104 to 129. "You-You-You" by Polysics is used from episode 130 to 154.  by Chinatouchable (Chinatsu Wakatsuki & Untouchable) is used as Ending from episode 104 to 116.  by Kirin is used as Ending from episode 117 to 141.  by Afromania is used as Ending from episode 142 to 154.


Episode list

References

External links
  3rd season episodes
  Keroro Gunsō schedule - Sunrise

2006 Japanese television seasons
2007 Japanese television seasons
Season 3